The Gawad Urian Awards are annual film awards in the Philippines held since 1977. It is given by the Manunuri ng Pelikulang Pilipino (MPP, "the Filipino Film Critics") and is currently regarded as the counterpart of the United States' New York Film Critics Circle.

Establishment 
The MPP was formed by a host of scholars, film writers and other award-winning writers on May 1, 1976, as a critics' voice to rival the then-only award-giving body in the Philippines, which is its Oscars', the FAMAS Awards. Three years earlier, what would be the members of the MPP were included in the judges' roster of the FAMAS after a shocking 1972 Best Actress tie materialized between major star Boots Anson-Roa and then-rising star Vilma Santos. A tie was unheard of at that time, which resulted in accusations of lessening prestige on the part of FAMAS. After a voting stint at the FAMAS, these future MPP members set up the Gawad Urian Awards.

Members 
The members of the MPP who judge the annual Gawad Urian are:

 Rolando Tolentino, president of MPP
 Grace Javier Alfonso
 Butch Francisco
 Mario Hernando
 Bienvenido Lumbera
 Miguel Rapatan
 Benilda Santos
 Dr. Nicanor Tiongson
 Tito Genova Valiente
 Lito Zulueta

Awards 
The Gawad Urian Awards were established to, in Tagalog, "suriin ang mga pelikulang Pilipino, pasiglahin ang diyalogo ng mga manonood at ng industriya ng pelikula, pag-aralan ang mga tunguhing makapagpapahusay sa pelikula, at linangin ang kaalaman sa tungkulin ng pelikula bilang medyum ng ekspresyon at komunikasyon, ayon sa mga kondisyon ng paggawa ng pelikula sa ating bayan (examine Filipino films, bolster the interest of the masses and the Philippine film industry, study and celebrate the achievement that will help define the good Filipino film, and cultivate the knowledge and skills that the film medium was designed for, which is to be a medium of communication and expression of our culture according to the standards and conditions of filmmaking in our country)."

The MPP chose the name "Gawad Urian" from Tagalog terms urian (a standard for gold) and gawad (award) for its awards. It is the only major award-giving body in the Philippines (the others being the FAMAS Awards, the Luna Awards and the Star Awards for Movies) to use the vernacular in awards shows and in the presentation of the awards.

The Gawad Urian is given in twelve categories and have been annually awarded since 1977. In 1988, the awards for the films of 1987 were not held because the MPP deemed that there was a "lack of deserving winners," which was a first in Filipino awards history. The fourteen categories of the awards, named in Tagalog, are the following:

 Pinakamahusay na Pelikula (Best Film) 
 Pinakamahusay na Direksyon (Best Direction)
 Pinakamahusay na Pangunahing Aktor (Best Actor)
 Pinakamahusay na Pangunahing Aktres (Best Actress)
 Pinakamahusay na Pangalawang Aktor (Best Supporting Actor)
 Pinakamahusay na Pangalawang Aktres (Best Supporting Actress)
 Pinakamahusay na Dulang Pampelikula (Best Screenplay)
 Pinakamahusay na Sinematograpiya (Best Cinematography)
 Pinakamahusay na Disenyong Pamproduksyon (Best Production Design)
 Pinakamahusay na Editing (Best Editing)
 Pinakamahusay na Musika (Best Music)
 Pinakamahusay na Tunog (Best Sound)
 Pinakamahusay na Maikling Pelikula (Best Short Film)
 Pinakamahusay na Dokyumentaryo (Best Documentary)

The Gawad Urian also awards the Natatanging Gawad Urian (Gawad Urian Lifetime Achievement Award) to a film artisan whose contributions have helped shape the Filipino film industry.

The Mga Natatanging Aktor at Aktres ng Dekada (Best Actors and Actresses of the Decade) are given every first year of the decade to actor/s and actress/es who had made outstanding works in the past decade. Recipients of the award are:

1980s: Gina Alajar, Nora Aunor, Phillip Salvador, Vilma Santos
1990s: Nora Aunor, Richard Gomez, Vilma Santos
2000s: Coco Martin, Gina Pareño, Cherry Pie Picache
2010s: Nora Aunor, Angeli Bayani, John Lloyd Cruz, Alessandra de Rossi

In 1992, the Gawad Urian gave the Ginintuang Gawad Urian (the Golden Urian Award) to Mike de Leon. It would be the first and the last time that the MPP would give out the award.

Criteria and quality 
The Gawad Urian is one of the most prestigious film award-giving bodies in the Philippines. For the thirty years that the MPP has existed, it has not been tainted with any accusations of vote buying or scandals that tainted most of its counterparts in the Philippines. This distinction made the Gawad Urian a highly coveted award in the Philippine film industry that is only given to the most deserved winners.

The Gawad Urian is also known for its infamous ties. At a time when the Filipino award-giving bodies were adamant about awarding ties after the FAMAS rock-up in 1972, the Gawad Urian has given ties in the Best Film category (3 ties), Best Screenplay category (1), Best Actress category (6) and Best Supporting Actress category (2), a dozen ties all in all.

The Gawad Urian is known for awarding several lesser-known films produced by small independent production companies. In 2004, Ebolusyon ng Isang Pamilyang Pilipino, a landmark Filipino drama, was awarded Pinakamahusay na Pelikula (Best Film) by Gawad Urian, while it did not receive a single nomination from any award-giving body that year.

In 2006, the Gawad Urian became the first award-giving body in the Philippine to welcome digital films into competition. Its nominees were swamped with achievement from digital films that year, which prompted the other award-giving bodies to include digital films in its roster of nominations the next year.

Best Films of the Decade (Mga Natatanging Pelikula ng Dekada)

References

External links
 Official website of Manunuri ng Pelikulang Pilipino
 Gawad Urian Awards at the Internet Movie Database

Gawad Urian Awards
Philippine film awards
Awards established in 1977
Award ceremonies in the Philippines